Moycullen railway station was on the Midland Great Western Railway (MGWR) Galway to Clifden railway.

History
It had two  platforms,  goods platform, and a  cattle loading bank.

The station closed with the line in 1935,  While the line has been paved over several buildings remain but are adapted for private and business usage.

References

Footnotes

Sources

Further reading
 

Disused railway stations in County Galway
Railway stations opened in 1895
Railway stations closed in 1935